Mike McClean is a British stand up comedian, television presenter and actor. He was a roving reporter on Richard & Judy and The Big Breakfast and appeared in The Office: "Christmas Special", Shameless, My Mad Fat Diary and Richard Osman's House of Games. He also has two sons. Carter McClean is an English footballer who plays for Billericay Town whilst Cooper McClean plays at Ipswich ladies team

Career 
He attended the Arden School of Theatre before going on to study at the Contact Youth Theatre. McClean spent 2 years at drama school and left to pursue his dream of acting and comedy.

McClean started presenting on Nickelodeon. He presented for other children's television shows such as It's Not Fair and wrote Mad for It for ITV.  He then presented for adult shows, including Richard & Judy.  In 2003, McClean appeared in the Christmas special of The Office.

McClean hosted the XFM Manchester Breakfast Show between June 2008 and 2009. In 2013 he played Fin's dad in the C4 series My Mad Fat Diary. In 2016, he provided the voice-over for Watchdog Test House. Mike played Father Tony in Shameless.

References

External links
Official website
Profile ukgameshows.com

Year of birth missing (living people)
Living people
British television presenters
British radio personalities